Devil's Path is an EP by Norwegian black metal band Dimmu Borgir. It was originally released in 1996 by Hot Records. This album was reissued in 1999 along with the Old Man's Child Split EP In the Shades of Life, eventually becoming known as Sons of Satan Gather for Attack. The title track would later be re-recorded and released as part of the special edition of their album Puritanical Euphoric Misanthropia.

Track listing

Personnel

Dimmu Borgir
Shagrath - lead vocals and lead guitar; keyboards, lyrics, music (1 & 2), cover art
Erkekjetter Silenoz - rhythm guitar; music (1 & 2)
Nagash - bass guitar and backing vocals
Tjodalv - drums

Additional personnel
Christophe "Volvox" Szpajdel - logo
Marius Ryen - producer and engineering
Vargnatt - mastering

References

Dimmu Borgir albums
1996 EPs